Highway 230 (AR 230, Ark. 230, and Hwy. 230) is a designation for four state highways in Arkansas. One route of  begins at Highway 14/Highway 25 at Locust Grove and runs east to US Highway 167 (US 167) in Southside. A second route of  begins at US 167 in Cave City and runs east to Highway 25 in Strawberry. A third route of  begins at Highway 367 in Alicia and runs east to US 63 Business (US 63B) in Bono. A fourth route of  begins at US 49B and runs east to Highway 135 at Dixie. All routes are maintained by the Arkansas State Highway and Transportation Department (AHTD).

Route description

Locust Grove to Southside
AR 230 begins in Locust Grove at AR 14/AR 25. The route runs east through Jamestown to Southside, where it terminates at US 167.

Cave City to Strawberry
AR 230 begins in Cave City at US 167. It runs east to Strawberry, where it meets AR 25 and terminates. It does not cross or concur with any other state highways.

Alicia to Bono
AR 230 begins in Alicia at Arkansas Highway 367 (Former US 67).The route runs east to meet the new U.S. Route 67 Freeway (Future Interstate 57) and AR 91 in rural Lawrence County. AR 230 continues east to cross US 63 outside of Bono, terminating at US 63 BUS.

Brookland to Dixie
AR 230 runs due east from US 49 BUS in Brookland to AR 135 in Dixie.

History
Highway 230 was first authorized by the Arkansas State Highway Commission (ASHC) on July 10, 1957 between Cave City and Strawberry. A second route was designated between Alicia and Bono on June 23, 1965, with a third highway created between Brookland and Dixie on January 12, 1966. The final section was created on April 26, 1978 when Highway 14 was rerouted onto Highway 25 toward Batesville. Highway 230 replaced the Highway 14 designation between Locust Grove and Southside.

Major intersections

Former routes

Brookland

Route description
The route began at a county road junction and ran east to Highway 1 north of Brookland.

History
A segment of Highway 230 was created north of Brookland on March 28, 1973 pursuant to Act 9 of 1973 by the Arkansas General Assembly at the request of the Arkansas County Judge. The entire route was deleted on April 27, 1979 in a swap involving many highways requested by the Craighead County Judge.

Major intersections

Swifton

Route description
The route began at a county road junction and ran east to US 67 (now Highway 367) northeast of Swifton.

History
A segment of Highway 230 was created northeast of Swifton on April 23, 1975. The Jackson County Judge proposed an exchange to delete the entire route in exchange for the creation of Highway 224. The ASHC authorized the exchange on February 28, 1979.

Major intersections

See also

 List of state highways in Arkansas

References

External links

230
Transportation in Sharp County, Arkansas
Transportation in Lawrence County, Arkansas
Transportation in Independence County, Arkansas
Transportation in Craighead County, Arkansas